Notable current and former residents of South Orange, New Jersey include:

 Platt Adams (1885–1961), athlete who won a gold medal in the standing high jump and a silver medal in the standing long jump at the 1912 Summer Olympics in Stockholm
 Jessica Antiles (born {1996), competitive swimmer
 Mark Armstrong, college basketball player for the Villanova Wildcats
 Paul Auster (born 1947), author known for works blending absurdism and crime fiction
 Olivia Baker (born 1996), middle-distance runner who specializes in the 800 meters
 Louis Bamberger (1855–1944), department store founder and philanthropist
 Jane Barus (1892–1977), member of the Constitutional convention that formulated the 1947 New Jersey State Constitution
 Kelly Bishop (born 1944), actress, current resident
 Ken Bloom, particle physicist
 Bisa Butler (born 1973), fiber artist known for her quilted portraits and designs celebrating black life
 Joshua Braff (born 1967), novelist
 Zach Braff (born 1975), actor on the TV series Scrubs; writer and director of the movie Garden State
 Andre Braugher (born 1962), actor, current resident
 Chris Broussard (born 1968), sports analyst for ESPN, current resident
 Chris Browne (born 1952), cartoonist, Hägar the Horrible
 Mark Bryant (born 1965), former NBA player
 Gerardo Catena (1902–2000), mobster
 Jonah David (born 1977), drummer/percussionist
 James Delany (born 1948), commissioner of the Big Ten Conference
 Joetta Clark Diggs (born 1962), retired track and field champion, specializing in middle distance running
 John Dossett (born 1958), actor, current resident
 John B. Duff (1931–2013), historian who served as the 8th President of Columbia College Chicago
 Asher Brown Durand (1796–1886), painter
 Roy Eisenhardt (born 1939), lawyer and former president of the Oakland Athletics
 John Franklin Fort (1852–1920), 33rd Governor of New Jersey, 1908–1911
 Felix Fuld (1868–1929), co-founder of the L. Bamberger & Company department store
 Jared Gilman (born 1998), actor who appeared in the film Moonrise Kingdom
 Kai Greene (born 1993), soccer player for Rio Grande Valley FC Toros in the United Soccer League
 Ronnie Hickman, American football safety who played college football at Ohio State
 Lauryn Hill (born 1975), musician, solo and with The Fugees
 Jerome Hines (1921–2003), opera singer with the Metropolitan Opera
 Alberto Ibargüen (born 1944), President and CEO of the John S. and James L. Knight Foundation and former publisher of The Miami Herald
 Andrew Jacobs, journalist for The New York Times, documentary film director and producer
 Wyclef Jean (born 1969), member of The Fugees
 Hallett Johnson (1888–1968), career diplomat who served as the United States Ambassador to Costa Rica
 James Kaplan (born 1951), novelist
 Peter W. Kaplan (1954–2013), newspaper editor best known for his 15-year-long stint as Editor-In-Chief of The New York Observer
 Stacey Kent (born 1968), singer and recording artist Blue Note Records
 Alfred Kinsey (1894–1956), sex researcher, who moved to the town in 1904
 Robert Kirsch (born 1965/1966), state court judge from New Jersey who is a nominee to serve as a United States district judge of the United States District Court for the District of New Jersey
 Michael Lally (born 1942), poet and author
 Frank Langella (born 1938), actor
 Lee Leonard (1929–2018), journalist, current resident, husband of Kelly Bishop
 David Levin (1948–2017), balloonist, who is the only person to have completed the "triple crown" by winning the World Gas Balloon Championship, the World Hot Air Ballooning Championships and the Gordon Bennett Cup
 William Lowell Sr. (1863–1954), dentist and an inventor of a wooden golf tee patented in 1921
 Selah Marley (born 1998), fashion model and singer.
 Joe Martinez (born 1983), Major League Baseball pitcher who has played for the San Francisco Giants, Cleveland Indians and Arizona Diamondbacks
 Elmer Matthews (1927–2015), lawyer and politician who served three terms in the New Jersey General Assembly
 Sean McCourt (born 1971), Broadway actor
 Walter I. McCoy (1859–1933), represented New Jersey's 8th congressional district, 1911–1913, and the 9th district, 1913–1914; village trustee 1893–1895, 1901–1905, and in 1910
 Roderick Fletcher Mead (1900–1971), painter best known for his engravings
 T. S. Monk (born 1949), jazz musician
 Micol Ostow (born 1976), author, editor and educator
 Michele Pawk (born 1961), actor
 Thomas J. Preston, Jr. (1862–1955), professor of archeology at Princeton University; married Frances Cleveland, widow of President Grover Cleveland
 James Rebhorn (1948–2014), actor whose films include Independence Day and Meet the Parents
 Marc Roberts (born 1959), entrepreneur, sports manager, real estate developer and businessman
 Don Rogers (born 1936), former NFL and AFL offensive lineman
 Alan Sagner (1920–2018), politician, businessman and philanthropist who served as New Jersey Commissioner of Transportation, as Chairman of the Port Authority of New York and New Jersey, and as Chairman of the Corporation for Public Broadcasting
 David M. Satz Jr. (1926–2009), attorney who served as U.S. Attorney for the District of New Jersey from 1961 to 1969
 Joseph Scheuerle (1873–1948), painter and illustrator best known for his portraits of Native Americans
 Peter Shapiro (born 1952), financial services executive and former politician who was the youngest person ever elected to the New Jersey General Assembly and went on to serve as Essex County Executive
 Andrew Shue (born 1967), actor; co-founder of CafeMom
 Elisabeth Shue (born 1963), actress
 Joel Silver (born 1952), director and producer
 Kiki Smith (born 1954), artist
 Michael Peter Smith (1941–2020), singer-songwriter
 Seton Smith (born 1955), artist and photographer
 Tony Smith (1912–1980), sculptor
 Kevin Spacey (born 1959), actor
 Edwin Stern (born 1941), lawyer and judge who served as acting justice on the New Jersey Supreme Court
 Mason Toye (born 1998), soccer player with CF Montréal of Major League Soccer
 Jeff Van Note (born 1946), former Atlanta Falcons player and Georgia Tech broadcaster
 Jeffrey Vanderbeek, owner of the New Jersey Devils
 Max Weinberg (born 1951), drummer for E-Street Band and Late Night with Conan O'Brien
 Lonnie Wright (1944–2012), professional basketball and football player; played in the same season for the Denver Rockets of the American Basketball Association and the Denver Broncos of the American Football League before switching to basketball on a full-time basis
 Aaron D. Wyner (1939–1997), information theorist noted for his contributions in coding theory

References

Lists of people from New Jersey